Shin Ji-hoon (Hangul: 신지훈; born June 23, 1998) is a South Korean singer, actress and figure skater. She was signed under Cube Entertainment and Starline Entertainment. She is known as TOP 6 of SBS's K-pop Star Season 2. From 2017, Shin Ji-hoon became an individual singer.

Discography 

 Youth (2019)

Filmography

Television

Film

Figure skating

Competition results

Awards

Other activities

References

External links
  

1998 births
Cube Entertainment artists
K-pop Star participants
Living people
South Korean women pop singers
South Korean female idols
South Korean female single skaters
21st-century South Korean singers
21st-century South Korean women singers
School of Performing Arts Seoul alumni